The Archdeaconry of Barnstaple or Barum is one of the oldest archdeaconries in England. It is an administrative division of the Diocese of Exeter in the Church of England.

History
The Diocese of Exeter was divided into four archdeaconries in Norman times, probably during the bishopric of Osbern FitzOsbern (1072–1103):
Exeter
Barnstaple
Totnes
Cornwall

In 1782, it was noted that the archdeaconry contained the deaneries of Barum (Barnstaple), Chumleigh, Hertland, Shirwell, South Molton and Torrington.

The archdeaconry currently comprises the following deaneries:
Deanery of Barnstaple
Deanery of Hartland
Deanery of Holsworthy
Deanery of Shirwell
Deanery of South Molton
Deanery of Torrington

List of archdeacons

High Medieval
Allured (first archdeacon)
?–1143: Ralph (I)
: William de Auco
bef. –aft. : Roger
bef. 1203–?: Thomas
30 September 1209–?: Ralph de Werewell
John
bef. –?: Ralph (II)
?–8 February 1227 (d.): Isaac
Walter de Pembroke (afterwards Archdeacon of Totnes)
21 January 1263 – 1264: Henry de Bracton
25 May 1264–?: Richard Blund (afterwards Archdeacon of Totnes;
possibly son of Richard Blund, Bishop of Exeter)
6 November 1265–May 1267: Godfrey Giffard (also Archdeacon of Wells from 1267; later Bishop of Worcester)
May 1267–?: John de Bradleigh
January 1271–?: Thomas de Hertford
28 August 1279–?: Philip of Exon

Late Medieval
?–1308: Ralph Germeyn
13 October 1308 – 1309: William Melton (later Archbishop of York)
4 January 1309 – 1309: William Fitsrogo
30 March 1309 – 1312: John Wele
? ("a short time"): Bartholomew de Sancto Laurentio
26 March 1312 – 3 December 1314 (res.): Walter Giffard
7 February 1315 – 1318 (d.): Richard de Morcester (afterwards Archdeacon of Exeter)
22 September 1318 – 1329: Richard de Wideslade
10/15 December 1329 – 1330: William Zouche
17 December 1330 – 1349: John de Nassington
8 April 1350 – 1351: John de Reynham
: Hugh de Monyton
23 February 1355 – 2 September 1358: John de Derby
2 September 1358–: William de Mugge
bef. 1371 or 23 February 1384–: Henry Whitefield
bef. 1395 or 8 September 1399 – 1400: Robert Rygge
17/22 August 1400 – 1400: Richard Aldtyngton
1 November 1400 – 1429 (res.): John Orum
2 August 1429 – 1442 (d.): John Waryn
3 August 1442 – 1445 (res.): Richard Helyer
16 June 1445 – 1449 (res.): Michael Tregury (afterwards Archbishop of Dublin)
25 January 1450 – 1459: Roger Keys
12 July 1462–October 1475 (d.): William Fulford
27 October 1475 – 1476 (res.): John Stubbes
10 December 1476 – 1478 (res.): Owen Lord
18 February 1478 – 8 October 1485 (d.): Robert Barforth

bef. 1492–: William Elyot
?–1508: John Vesey (later Dean of Windsor and Bishop of Exeter)
3 August 1508–: Richard Norton
–1515 (res.): John Young
12 April 1515 – 1518 (d.): John Tyake
19 January 1518 – 26 April 1528 (d.): Richard Tollett
26 April 1528 – 29 May 1544 (d.): Thomas Brerwood

Early modern
16 June 1544 – 1554 (deprived): John Pollard (also Archdeacon of Wilts until 1544, Archdeacon of Cornwall until 1545)
20 April 1554 – 1582 (res.): Henry Squire
7 January 1583 – 1585: Robert Lawe
24 April 1585 – 1605: William Tooker
27 November 1605 – 21 November 1645 (d.): William Helyar
1645–1660: Vacancy during the English Commonwealth.
31 August 1660 – 1662: James Smith
1662–1679 (d.): Joshua Tucker
29 August 1679 – 1703 (d.): William Read
24 September 1703 – 1709 (d.): Robert Burscough
9 September 1709 – 11 August 1724 (d.): Thomas Lynford (also Canon of Westminster)
1724–1731: Lewis Stephens (afterwards Archdeacon of Chester)
28 October 1731 – 1744 (d.): John Grant
16 March 1745 – 26 October 1791 (d.): William Hole
3 November 1791 – 1798 (d.): Roger Massey
14 March 1798 – 3 July 1799 (d.): John Andrew
25 July 1799 – 28 June 1805 (d.): Peregrine Ilbert
16 August 1805–? (res.): Jonathan Fisher
3 November 1807 – 1826 (d.): Thomas Johnes
1826–1830 (res.): John Bull
1830–1847: George Barnes
1847–1865: John Bartholomew

Late modern
1865–1885: Henry Woollcombe
1885–1890: Herbert Barnes
1890–24 December 1908 (d.): Albert Seymour
1908–9 July 1930 (d.): Robert Trefusis, Bishop of Crediton
1930–26 June 1935 (d.): Frank Jones
1935–1945: Edgar Hay
1946–1958: Denis James
1958–1962: Guy Sanderson
1962–1970: Arthur Ward (afterwards Archdeacon of Exeter)
1970–1988: Ronald Herniman
1989–2002 (ret.): Trevor Lloyd
2003–2014 (ret.): David Gunn-Johnson
1 September 2014 – 2015: Mike Edson (Acting)
23 March 20146 September 2020: Mark Butchers
September 2021 onwards: Verena Breed

References

Sources

 
 Gribble, Joseph Besly–Memorials of Barnstaple: being an attempt to supply the want of a history of that ancient borough; 1830; pp 483–486 (Google eBook)

Lists of Anglicans
Archdeacons of Barnstaple
Diocese of Exeter
Lists of English people
Christianity in Devon